De Coster or Decoster is a Dutch occupational surname, most common in Flanders. Coster is an archaic spelling of modern Dutch "koster" (parish clerk). People with this surname include:

Adam de Coster (c. 1586–1643), Flemish Baroque painter 
Charles De Coster (1827–1879), Belgian novelist best known for his Legend of Thyl Ulenspiegel
Dominicus de Coster (c. 1560–1612), Flemish artist, printer and copperplate engraver
Jean-Baptiste De Coster (guide) (1760–1826), an unwilling Flemish guide for Napoleon at Waterloo
Jean-Baptiste De Coster (Jesuit) (1896–1968), a Belgian priest who sheltered Jews from the Holocaust
Jonathan Decoster (born 1987), American football player
Koen Decoster, Belgian historian, philosopher and translator
Maggy de Coster (born 1966), French writer
Maurice De Coster (1890–?), Belgian football player
Roger De Coster (born 1944), Belgian motocross racer and team manager
Saskia De Coster (born 1976), Belgian writer

See also
Coster (disambiguation)
Koster (disambiguation)

Dutch-language surnames
Surnames of Belgian origin
Occupational surnames